Sody's yellow bat or Sody's yellow house bat (Scotophilus collinus) is a species of vesper bat. It is native to Island Southeast Asia, where it is found in Indonesia, Malaysia, and Timor-Leste. This species was described in 1936.

References

Scotophilus
Mammals of Timor
Mammals described in 1936
Bats of Southeast Asia